Ali Ashour is an Egyptian football manager.

Career
Ashour managed Al Ahli in Libya. He was appointed as head coach of Misr Lel Makkasa SC from 22 September to 12 October 2020.

Managerial statistics

References

1971 births
Living people
Egyptian football managers
Expatriate football managers in Libya